Hernán Edgardo Díaz (born February 26, 1965 in Barrancas) is a former Argentine football right back. During his club career he played for Rosario Central, Los Andes, River Plate and Colón de Santa Fe.

Early career

Díaz started his career in the Argentine 2nd division with Rosario Central in 1985, after a short spell with Los Andes he returned to Rosario to help the club win the 1986-1987 Primera Division Argentina. His performances earned him a place in the national team and he represented Argentina at the Copa América 1987 and 1989.

River Plate

Díaz joined River Plate in 1989, helping the club to win the 1989-1990 title in his first season he went on to win 8 league titles with the club as well as the Copa Libertadores in 1996 and the Supercopa Sudamericana in 1997. His 10 titles as a player make him the second most decorated player in the history of Club Atlético River Plate, second only to his longtime team mate Leonardo Astrada's 11.

During his time at River Díaz played for Argentina at the 1994 FIFA World Cup.

Later career

Díaz left River to join Colón de Santa Fe in 2000 but returned for one last season with River in 2000-2001.

Honours
 Rosario Central
Primera División Argentina: 1986–87

 River Plate
Primera División Argentina: 1989–90, Apertura 1991, Apertura 1993, Apertura 1994, Apertura 1996, Clausura 1997, Apertura 1997, Apertura 1999
Copa Libertadores: 1996
Supercopa Sudamericana: 1997

Facts

Díaz is the second most decorated player in the history of Club Atlético River Plate with 10 titles.
Díaz played 73 games in the Copa Libertadores, scoring 7 goals, the only Argentine to have played more Libertadores games was Julio César Falcioni with 76.

References

External links

1965 births
Living people
Argentine footballers
Argentina international footballers
1994 FIFA World Cup players
1987 Copa América players
1989 Copa América players
Rosario Central footballers
Club Atlético Los Andes footballers
Club Atlético River Plate footballers
Club Atlético Colón footballers
Footballers at the 1988 Summer Olympics
Olympic footballers of Argentina
Argentine Primera División players
Association football defenders
Sportspeople from Santa Fe Province